Kamieniec Ząbkowicki  is a town in Ząbkowice Śląskie County, Lower Silesian Voivodeship, in south-western Poland. It is the seat of the administrative district (gmina) called Gmina Kamieniec Ząbkowicki. The town is an important railroad junction, located on the main line which links Wrocław with Kłodzko and Prague. In Kamieniec, this route crosses with the west-east connection from Jaworzyna Śląska to Kędzierzyn-Koźle.

The village has a population of 4,200.

History

The name of the town comes from the Polish word kamień, which means "stone". It was mentioned in the oldest Polish chronicle Gesta principum Polonorum from the early 12th century. The place is known for the former Kamieniec Abbey, established in 1209 as an Augustinian college by Bishop Wawrzyniec of Wrocław at the site of a former castle of Bretislaus II of Bohemia. It was then part of the Silesian Duchy of Piast-ruled Poland. In 1247 it became a filial monastery of the Cistercian Lubiąż Abbey.

King Frederick II of Prussia hid here from Habsburg troops on February 27, 1741 during the First Silesian War. Following the war, the village fell under Prussian suzerainty. Secularized in 1810 by order of King Frederick William III of Prussia, the estates of Kamieniec (then under the Germanized name Kamenz) were acquired by Wilhelmine of Prussia, wife of King William I of the Netherlands. Between 1838 and 1873 their daughter Princess Marianne of the Netherlands and her husband Prince Albert of Prussia had a new palace built in a Neogothic style according to the plans of Karl Friedrich Schinkel.

In 1871 the settlement became part of Germany, and during World War II Nazi Germany carried out murders of mentally ill children by involuntary euthanasia in the local monastery building (see: Aktion T4). In the final stages of the war, the palace was plundered and set on fire by the occupying Soviet Red Army.

Following the war, in 1945, the village became again part of Poland, and the adjective Ząbkowicki (after the nearby town and county seat of Ząbkowice Śląskie) was added to the name to distinguish it from other settlements of the same name, which are very common throughout Poland. The palace was restored in 1995.

In July 2020, Kamieniec Ząbkowicki received town rights with effect from 2021.

Sports
The local football team is Zamek Kamieniec Ząbkowicki. It competes in the lower leagues.

Gallery

Surroundings 
 Kamieniec Ząbkowicki Palace
 Gola Dzierżoniowska Castle
 Medieval town of Niemcza
 Cistercian monastery at Henryków
 Wojsławice Arboretum

References

External links
  Kamieniec Palace

Cities and towns in Lower Silesian Voivodeship
Ząbkowice Śląskie County